The ratan goby (Ponticola ratan) is a species of goby native to brackish and marine waters of the Black Sea, the Sea of Azov and the Caspian Sea. In the Caspian Sea it is presented by subspecies Ponticola ratan goebeli.  It occurs in inshore waters, inhabiting areas with stone or gravel substrates.  This species can reach a length of  TL.

References

External links
 http://fish.kiev.ua/pages/ukrfishm/ukrfishm79.htm
 http://www.grid.unep.ch/bsein/redbook/txt/neogob-r.htm?%20PISCES

Ponticola
Fish of Europe
Fish of the Caspian Sea
Fish of the Black Sea
Fish described in 1840
Taxa named by Alexander von Nordmann